Koninklijke Racing Club Genk, commonly known as KRC Genk, Racing Genk or simply Genk, is a Belgian professional football club based in the city of Genk in Belgian Limburg.  Racing Genk plays in the Belgian Pro League and have won four championship titles; in 1998–99, in 2001–02, in 2010–11 and in 2018–19. They have also won five Belgian Cups, most recently in 2020–21. They qualified for the UEFA Champions League group stage in the 2002–03, 2011–12 and 2019–20.

The club formed in 1988 by the merger of Waterschei Thor with KFC Winterslag, from which it took over the matricule number.  It has been one of the most successful clubs in Belgium since the late 1990s and so they regularly qualify for European competitions. The club has been playing in the first division since the 1996–97 season. They play their home matches in the Cegeka Arena. Their main outfit is blue and white.

History

KFC Winterslag history (1923–1988)
The club FC Winterslag was founded in 1923 and that gave it the matricule number 322. On its 35th anniversary the club added the Royal prefix Koninklijke to their name to become KFC Winterslag. In 1972–73 Winterslag reached the second division and they eventually qualified for the 1974–75 Belgian First Division after finishing second in the second division final round. They had taken advantage of the increase in the number of first division clubs (from 16 to 20). The club ended the season in last place but won the second division right after.

KFC Winterslag reached the 5th place in 1981 which allowed them to play UEFA Cup matches, where it defeated Bryne FK from Norway and English Premier league giant Arsenal. In the next round it was knocked out by Dundee United from Scotland. Two seasons later it was relegated to the second stage after a disappointing last place. That season Standard Liège won the championship on bribery in a match against the club of Waterschei Thor that would eventually merge with the matricule number 322.  Following a spell of four seasons in the second division, Winterslag found its place again in the first division by winning the 1987 final round, one point ahead of Tongeren. It finished 15th on 18 but at the end of the season, the club merged with the neighbour club of Waterschei Thor which was playing in the second division since its relegation in 1986.

K Waterschei SV Thor Genk

K Waterschei SV Thor was created in 1919 as Waterschei's Sport Vereeniging Thor with Thor being the acronym of Tot Herstel Onzer Rechten. It received matricule number n°533. The club enjoyed a spell in the first division in the late 1950s to the early 1960s and again from 1978 to 1986.

During the 1982–83 season, the match between Standard Liège and Waterschei  and Standard eventually won the championship. Waterschei won the Belgian Cup twice (1980 and 1982). The latter victory led to them reaching the semi-finals of the European Cup Winners Cup in the 1982–83 season. After defeating PSG in the quarter-finals, Waterschei lost the first leg of the semi-final 5–1 at Pittodrie Stadium, home of the eventual winners, Aberdeen A 1–0 victory in Waterschei, courtesy of Eddy Voordeckers, could not reverse the position.

After two seasons in the second division, K. Waterschei SV Thor Genk merged with KFC Winterslag in 1988 to form the current KRC Genk.

K.R.C. Genk (1988–present)
1990s and 2000s

The new club was named KRC Genk and as it kept the Winterslag ranking, it began in the first division but finished last. The next year Genk managed to win the final round in 2nd division and then played 4 seasons in the first division. In 1995 the club hired Aimé Anthuenis a coach and Racing finished second and skipped the final round as two first division teams merged (Seraing and Standard Liège). After an eighth place in 1997, the club had a good 1997–98 season with a cup win and a second place in the championship. In its first European season, Racing Genk eliminated successively Apolonia Fier and MSV Duisburg but it lost to Mallorca in the round of 16 after two draws (1–1 on aggregate) in the last Cup Winners' Cup ever. The season was ended well as Genk won its first Belgian championship in May, with manager Aimé Anthuenis then moving to Anderlecht.

Genk played in the UEFA Champions League in 1999–2000 but lost in the second qualifying round to Maribor. The season was salvaged by winning the Belgian Cup again, this time to Standard, but Genk ended the championship in 9th place. It finished 11th in the following season and lost in the UEFA Cup second round to Werder Bremen after a win against FC Zürich. After this poor spell, Genk managed to win the championship once more in the 2001–02 season. In 2002–03, they reached the Champions League group stages for the first time in their history. Although they came 4th, they impressed fans with draws against Real Madrid, Roma and AEK Athens.

In the 2006–07 season, Genk finished second to Anderlecht. The Limburgians had been ahead almost the entire season but were pipped at the post by Anderlecht after losing at Germinal Beerschot. The 2007–08 season was a disaster, as Genk failed to finish in the top half of the division, ending in a disappointing tenth place.

Three bad seasons followed. Genk finished the 2007–08 season on 45 points and in 10th spot in the league: their worst result in seven years. The 2008–09 season was poor for Genk as well, finishing 8th in the league. The season ended on a positive note with them winning the Belgian Cup, which gave them a ticket to the fourth Europa League qualifying round. The 2009–10 season started badly when they were knocked out of the Europa League by Lille. Things did not go well in the domestic league either. Manager Hein Vanhaezebrouck was fired in December and was replaced by Franky Vercauteren. Genk finished 11th, but Vercauteren managed to lead the club to European football by beating derby rival Sint-Truiden in the final of Play-offs II.

2010s

The 2010–11 season started well for KRC Genk when they beat Inter Turku with 1–5 in Finland. They progressed to the 4th qualifying round of the Europa League and drew the Portuguese club Porto. Genk lost both games against Porto, despite two good performances.

On 30 January 2010, KRC Genk announced that coach Franky Vercauteren signed a new contract that ran untl June 2013.

They only lost their first game of the season on the 20th matchday and started the Play-offs in second place. The club won the 2010–11 Belgian Pro League after drawing 1–1 with title challengers Standard Liége.
This was KRC Genk's third league win in its history and its supporters celebrated with a pitch invasion straight after the final whistle.

On 11 August, coach Frank Vercauteren confirmed he was leaving Genk and signed with Abu Dhabi club Al-Jazira. In the 3rd Qualifying Round of the 2011–12 UEFA Champions League KRC Genk beat FK Partizan over two legs and drew Maccabi Haifa in the play-off Round. Maccabi Haifa beat Genk 2–1 in the first leg in Israel, while the second leg was won by Genk with the same 2–1 score in Belgium. During the penalty shoot-out, goalkeeper László Köteles helped Genk to qualify by saving two penalties. For the second time in its history, KRC Genk reached the group stages of the UEFA Champions League. They were drawn in Group E with Chelsea, Valencia and Bayer Leverkusen.

In late August 2011, Mario Been was announced as the new manager.
The Champions League campaign was one with ups and downs. Genk managed to get a 1–1 result against both Chelsea and Bayer Leverkusen and a goalless draw against Valencia. Away from home, Genk lost all three games.
The season in the Jupiler League was a difficult one, with Genk only just qualifying for the play-offs by finishing sixth in the regular competition. In the play-offs however, Genk started to play better and climbed up to third place. By finishing in third place, KRC Genk qualified for the third qualifying round of the Europa League.

The 2012–13 season started well for Genk by qualifying for the Europa League group stage after beating Aktobe and FC Luzern. In this group stage KRC Genk performed very well and ultimately won the group without a single defeat. Genk finished first with three points more than Basel and by doing so, qualified for the next round where they faced VfB Stuttgart. It was the first time in the club's history that they played European football after Christmas.
Stuttgart got the better of Genk over the two games.
In the league, Genk qualified for the play-offs and performed well until the title was out of reach; fifth place was the result. Genk ended their season on a positive note by winning the Belgian Cup. They defeated Cercle Brugge in the final, in front of 30,000 Genk fans.

In the 2016–2017 season, Genk participated in the UEFA Europa League; they started playing in the second qualifying round and qualified for the third qualifying round (on 21 July 2016) and the play-off round (on 4 August 2016). They won their group with 3 home victories over Athletic Bilbao, Rapid Wien and Sassuolo and after defeating Astra Giurgiu (2–2 and 1–0) in the 2nd round they drew KAA Gent from the domestic Belgian Pro League with 2 confusing games Gent-Genk, Genk-Gent and an impressive 2–5 away victory. Even when Genk got beaten in the quarter final against Celta de Vigo (3–2 and 1–1), it was Genk's most successful European season.

Genk won the 2018–19 Belgian First Division A for the fourth time in their history, hence they qualified for the 2019–20 UEFA Champions League after an eight-year absence.

Genk started their 2019–20 UEFA Champions League campaign with a poor 6–2 loss against Austrian club Red Bull Salzburg. In the second match they drew 0–0 against Napoli, and in the third match they lost 1–4 against Liverpool.

Youth academy
Genk is well known for its outstanding youth academy. In 2003 they built their youth center next to their stadium and set up a youth program with Ronny Vangeneugden. There are further plans to build a boarding school and some synthetic pitches. In the past and now, many young players have found their way through the youth system. Some examples are Yannick Carrasco, Jelle Vossen, Dennis Praet, Steven Defour, Christian Benteke, Thibaut Courtois, Divock Origi, Timothy Castagne, Leandro Trossard and Kevin De Bruyne.

Their scouting is also highly regarded. Players such as Kalidou Koulibaly, Wilfred Ndidi, Leon Bailey, Sergej Milinković-Savić and Sander Berge all played for Genk.

Honours
Belgian First Division:
Winners: 1998–99, 2001–02, 2010–11, 2018–19
Runners-up: 1997–98, 2006–07, 2020–21
Belgian Second Division:
Winners: 1975–76
Runners-up: 1986–87, 1995–96
Belgian Second Division Final Round:
Winners: 1987, 1990
Runners-up: 1974
Belgian Cup:
Winners: 1997–98, 1999–2000, 2008–09, 2012–13, 2020–21
Runners-up: 2017–18
Belgian Super Cup
Winners: 2011, 2019
Runners-up: 1998, 1999, 2000, 2002, 2009, 2013, 2021

European record

Updated 31 August 2018.

Summary of best results
From the quarter-finals upwards:

UEFA Cup/UEFA Europa League:
- Quarter-finalists in 2016–17
UEFA Intertoto Cup:
- Semi-finalists in 2003–04

UEFA club coefficient ranking
Genk got its highest ranking (44th) in the season 2016/17. 

Ranking in season 2021/22: Source:

Players

Current squad

Jong Genk

Other players under contract

Former players

Africa
DR Congo
  Neeskens Kebano 
Gambia
  Omar Colley
Guinea
  Souleymane Oulare 
Ivory Coast
  Didier Zokora 
Nigeria
  Wilfred Ndidi
Senegal
  Kalidou Koulibaly
  Kara Mbodj 
South Africa  
  Anele Ngcongca 
Tanzania
  Mbwana Samatta 
Asia
Australia 
  Mathew Ryan
  Danny Vukovic 
Europe
Belgium
  Luc Nilis
  Denis Dasoul
  Christian Kabasele
  Jelle Vossen
  Branko Strupar
  Pierre Denier  
  Pieter Gerkens 
  Timothy Castagne 
  Sébastien Pocognoli 
  Christian Benteke 
  Steven Defour 
  Leandro Trossard 
  Kevin De Bruyne 
  Thibaut Courtois
  Divock Origi
  Koen Casteels
  Thomas Buffel   
Bosnia and Herzegovina
  Mirsad Bešlija 
  Suvad Katana 
  Ismet Mulavdić 
  Bojan Nastić 
  Tino-Sven Sušić
Denmark
  Joakim Mæhle
Israel
  Elyaniv Barda 
Netherlands
  Jean-Paul Boëtius
  Sandy Walsh  
Norway
  Sander Berge 
Romania
  Ianis Hagi 
Serbia
  Sergej Milinković-Savić 
Slovakia
  Adam Nemec 
Spain
  Alejandro Pozuelo
  Jose Naranjo
Turkey
  Sinan Bolat
  Enes Ünal 
Ukraine
  Ruslan Malinovskyi 
North and Central America
Jamaica
  Leon Bailey

Club officials

Managers

 Ernst Künnecke (July 1988 – Nov 88)
 Joseph Vliers (1988–89)
 René Desaeyere (1989)
 Paul Theunis (1990–91)
 Pier Janssen (1991–93)
 Luka Peruzović (1993–94)
 Norbert Beuls (1994)
 Aimé Anthuenis (1996–99)
 Jos Heyligen (1999–2000)
 Johan Boskamp (31 Jan 2000 – 31 Dec 2000)
 Sef Vergoossen (1 July 2001 – 6 April 2004)
 René Vandereycken (17 May 2004 – 3 June 2005)
 Hugo Broos (13 June 2005 – 23 Feb 2008)
 Ronny Van Geneugden (17 Feb 2008 – 5 March 2009)
 Pierre Denier (interim) (6 March 2009 – 30 June 2009)
 Hein Vanhaezebrouck (1 July 2009 – 29 Nov 2009)
 Franky Vercauteren (3 Dec 2009 – 17 Aug 2011)
 Pierre Denier (interim) (18 Aug 2011 – 29 Aug 2011)
 Mario Been (30 Aug 2011 – 24 Feb 2014)
 Emilio Ferrera (24 Feb 2014 – 29 July 2014)
 Alex McLeish (22 Aug 2014 – 2015)
 Peter Maes (2015 – 26 Dec 2016)
 Albert Stuivenberg (27 Dec 2016 – 10 Dec 2017)
 Philippe Clement (18 Dec 2017 – 24 May 2019)
 Felice Mazzù (3 June 2019 – 12 Nov 2019)
 Hannes Wolf (19 Nov 2019 – 15 Sep 2020)
 Domenico Olivieri (interim) (15 Sep 2020 – 24 Sep 2020)
 Jess Thorup (24 Sep 2020 – 2 Nov 2020)
 John van den Brom (8 Nov 2020 – 6 Dec 2021)
 Bernd Storck (8 Dec 2021 – 22 May 2022)
 Wouter Vrancken (28 May 2022 - Present)

References

External links

  KRC Genk Official Website
  KRC Genk at UEFA.COM
 KRC Genk at EUFO.DE
 KRC Genk at Weltfussball.de
 KRC Genk at Football Squads.co.uk
 KRC Genk at National Football Teams.com
 KRC Genk at Football Lineups.com
  RC Genk XtraTime Fanpage

 
Association football clubs established in 1988
Football clubs in Belgium
1988 establishments in Belgium
Organisations based in Belgium with royal patronage
Belgian Pro League clubs
Sport in Limburg (Belgium)
Genk